Injevar (also, Indzhevar and Inchevar) is a town in the Syunik Province of Armenia.

See also 
Syunik Province

References 

Populated places in Syunik Province